Edward Samuel Dowell (born December 14, 1888) was an American football coach and college faculty member. He served as the head football coach at Western Illinois State Normal School (now known as Western Illinois University) in 1914. 

He was a 1910 graduate of Oberlin College in Oberlin, Ohio, and he received his master's degree from the University of Illinois at Urbana–Champaign in 1913.

References

1888 births
Year of death missing
Oberlin College alumni
Oberlin College faculty
People from Wooster, Ohio
University of Illinois Urbana-Champaign alumni
Western Illinois Leathernecks football coaches
Western Illinois University faculty